Detective 909 Keralathil is a 1970 Indian Malayalam-language spy film directed by P. Venu and produced by T. C. Sankar. The film stars Jayabharathi, KP Ummer, Sudheer, Vijayasree, Hemalatha, Sankaradi and Sreelatha Namboothiri. The film had musical score by M. K. Arjunan.

Plot

Cast 

Jayabharathi
K. P. Ummer
Kottarakkara Sreedharan Nair
Sudheer
Vijayasree
Hemalatha
Sankaradi
Sreelatha Namboothiri
T. S. Muthaiah
Sadhana
Abbas
Alummoodan
Girish Kumar
Junior Sheela
Kshema
Kuttan Pillai
M. S. Namboothiri
Meena
Nambiar
Panjabi
Ramu
Shamsudeen
Shyam Shankar
Sreekumar

Soundtrack 
The music was composed by M. K. Arjunan and the lyrics were written by P. Bhaskaran.

References

External links 
 

1970 films
1970s Malayalam-language films
1970s spy films
Films directed by P. Venu
Indian spy films